Peribaea is a genus of flies in the family Tachinidae.

Species

P. abbreviata Tachi & Shima, 2002
P. alternata Shima, 1981
P. annulata (Mesnil, 1954)
P. anthracina Mesnil, 1977
P. apaturae Tachi & Shima, 2002
P. argentifrons (Malloch, 1930)
P. baldwini (Malloch, 1930)
P. caesiata Tachi & Shima, 2002
P. cervina (Mesnil, 1954)
P. clara (Mesnil, 1954)
P. compacta (Curran, 1927)
P. discicornis (Pandellé, 1894)
P. egesta Tachi & Shima, 2002
P. ferina (Mesnil, 1954)
P. fissicornis (Strobl, 1910)
P. gibbicornis (Mesnil, 1954)
P. glabra Tachi & Shima, 2002
P. hertingi Andersen, 1996
P. hirsuta (Shima, 1970)
P. hongkongensis Tachi & Shima, 2002
P. hyalinata (Malloch, 1930)
P. illugiana (Shima, 1970)
P. insularia (Shima, 1970)
P. insularis (Shima, 1970)
P. jepsoni (Villeneuve, 1937)
P. leucophaea (Mesnil, 1963)
P. leucopheae (Mesnil, 1963)
P. lobata Mesnil, 1977
P. longirostris Andersen, 1996
P. longiseta (Villeneuve, 1936)
P. malayana (Malloch, 1935)
P. minuta Robineau-Desvoidy, 1863
P. mitis (Curran, 1927)
P. modesta (Mesnil, 1954)
P. orbata (Wiedemann, 1830)
P. palaestina (Villeneuve, 1934)
P. pectinata (Shima, 1970)
P. plebeia (Malloch, 1930)
P. pulla Mesnil, 1977
P. repanda (Mesnil, 1954)
P. rubea Mesnil, 1977
P. sedlaceki (Shima, 1970)
P. setinervis (Thomson, 1869)
P. similata (Malloch, 1930)
P. spoliata (Bezzi, 1923)
P. stiglinae (Bezzi, 1928)
P. subaequalis (Malloch, 1930)
P. suspecta (Malloch, 1924)
P. tibialis (Robineau-Desvoidy, 1851)
P. tiglinae (Bezzi, 1928)
P. timida (Mesnil, 1954)
P. trifurcata (Shima, 1970)
P. ugandana (Curran, 1933)
P. uniseta (Malloch, 1930)
P. ussuriensis (Mesnil, 1963)
P. vidua (Mesnil, 1954)

References

Tachininae
Tachinidae genera
Taxa named by Jean-Baptiste Robineau-Desvoidy